Phosphodiesterase type 9 (PDE9) is a type of phosphodiesterase enzyme.

Some inhibitors include BAY 73-6691 and PF-04447943.

References

Enzymes